The 2020–21 Nemzeti Bajnokság III is Hungary's third-level football competition.

Teams
The following teams have changed division since the 2019–20 season.

Stadium and locations
Following is the list of clubs competing in the league this season, with their location, stadium and stadium capacity.

Keleti (Eastern Group)

Közép (Centre Group)

Nyugati (Western Group)

Personnel and kits

Keleti (Eastern Group)

Standings

Keleti (Eastern)

Közép

Nyugati

See also
 2020–21 Magyar Kupa
 2020–21 Nemzeti Bajnokság I
 2020–21 Nemzeti Bajnokság II

References

External links
  
  

Nemzeti Bajnokság III seasons
2020–21 in Hungarian football
Hun